Yuriy Nikitenko is a Ukrainian retired footballer.

Career
Yuriy Nikitenko was born on 28 March 1974 rock. Vihovanets DUFC "Chornomorets" (Odessa). Professionally spent at the Kyiv City in Zirka Kropyvnytskyi, in a warehouse which in 1991 played 1 match. Then he turned to Odessa, training with the first team of Chornomorets Odesa, in the main team he did not win a place and he got transferred to another farm club in Chornomorets-2 Odesa, where on April 14, 1992, he made his debut in the home match of the 9th round of the 2nd round of the Ukrainian Second League against the Nikopolsk Metallurgist. The duel ended with a turn of the Nikopolsky team with a rakhunk 0: 2. Yuriy viyshov on the field on the 50th minutes, having replaced Eugen Nemodruk. With Chornomorets-2 Odesa in the Ukrainian championships he played 43 matches and 2 matches in Ukrainian Cup.

In 1994 he moved to Nyva Ternopil without becoming the main goalkeeper. He made his debut at the football player Nyva Ternopil on May 28, 1994, in the home match of the 30th round of the Ukrainian Premier League against Torpedo Zaporizhzhia, where Nikitenko entered on the field on the 85th minutes, having replaced Dmytro Tyapushkin. In 1998 he played 2 matches for the football team of Krystal Chortkiv, and in 2000 he played 1 matches in the football player Nyva Ternopil 2.

From 2001 to 2004, he played for Volyn Lutsk. December 17, 2001 I made my debut in the team of Chornomorets-2 Odesa at the home match of the 1st round of the Ukrainian First League against Borysfen Boryspil. Zagalom for Volyn Lutsk in the championships of Ukraine won 43 matches, in which they conceded 37 goals, more than 9 matches (7 missed goals) at the warehouse of the Lutsk players for the Ukrainian Cup.

From 2005 to 2006, he moved to Podillya Khmelnytskyi, where he made his debut on the 17th April 2005 in the home match  against Brovarsky "Nafkom" of the 24th round of the Ukrainian First League entering at 75th minutes, replacing Oleg Venchak. Stretching his own transfer to Podilli in the Ukrainian championships he won 32 matches, in which he conceded 33 goals. Another 1 match (1 ball conceded) has won the Ukrainian Cup. In 2007, he played 2 matches with Spartak Ivano-Frankivsk.

From 2007 to 2008 he played for Desna Chernihiv. For the Chernihiv team, he made his debut on 19 April 2007 of the 1st round of the Ukrainian First League against Burshtinsky "Energetika". Nikitenko viyshov and played the whole match, at the same time having closed the gates of his club "on lock". The football player Desna Chernihiv played 35 matches in the Ukrainian First League.

From 2011 to 2012, he moved to the amateur club FC Sovignon Tayirove in Odessa region. In 2011, the club became the winner of the Chernihiv Oblast Football Championship with the club.

Honours
FC Sovignon Tayirove
 Chernihiv Oblast Football Championship: 2011

Volyn Lutsk
 Ukrainian First League: 2001–02

References

External links 
 Yuriy Nikitenko footballfacts.ru
 Yuriy Nikitenko allplayers.in.ua

1974 births
Living people
FC Desna Chernihiv players
Ukrainian footballers
Ukrainian Premier League players
Ukrainian First League players
Ukrainian Second League players
Association football goalkeepers